The western wattled cuckooshrike or  Ghana cuckooshrike (Lobotos lobatus) is a species of bird in the family Campephagidae.
It is found in Ivory Coast, Ghana, Guinea, Liberia, and Sierra Leone.
Its natural habitats are subtropical or tropical moist lowland forest and subtropical or tropical swamps.
It is threatened by habitat loss.

References

External links
BirdLife Species Factsheet.
Image at ADW

western wattled cuckooshrike
Birds of West Africa
western wattled cuckooshrike
Taxonomy articles created by Polbot